John Kennedy (born 19 August 1978) is a semi-professional footballer who plays for Bury Town.

Kennedy began his career at Ipswich Town, where he made eight league appearances, before being twice loaned to Morecambe. After being released by Ipswich in 1999, he signed for Canvey Island, and later Histon, before going on to sign for Cambridge City. At the end of the 2010–11 season he signed for Bury Town.

Honours
Canvey Island
FA Trophy: 2000–01

References

External links

1978 births
English footballers
Ipswich Town F.C. players
Morecambe F.C. players
Canvey Island F.C. players
Histon F.C. players
Cambridge City F.C. players
Bury Town F.C. players
Living people
Association football midfielders